The ARIA Music Award for Best Australian Live Act, is a popular-voted award presented at the annual ARIA Music Awards, which recognises live performers. It replaces the previous category, ARIA Music Award for Most Popular Australian Live Artist, which had been first awarded in 2011. ARIA members may enter eligible acts as part of the normal entry process. The entries must meet the artist eligibility criteria and must have performed at ticketed events in at least three Australian States and/or Territories during the Eligibility Period. A Judging School will vote to determine the final 10 nominees, which will then form the nominee pool for public voting.

Winners and nominees

In the following table, the winner is highlighted in a separate colour, and in boldface; the nominees are those that are not highlighted or in boldface.

References

External links

Australian Live Act